The Perspective is a library displaying two sides of current events, historic conflicts and classic debates. The site's main goal is to allow its readers direct access to news and information, unfiltered by their usual personalized browsing preferences.

History
The Perspective was founded by CEO Daniel Ravner in 2016. An article published on the site in early 2017 defined the startup's objectives:

After initial planning, a $1,292,000 seed investment was raised in late 2016. Following a beta test of the concept, a successful launch on Product Hunt has followed in March 2017.

Awards
The Perspective has received 2 awards since its launch, and was nominated for 2 more in 2018. During its first year active, the site was the recipient of the 2017 "Best of" WebAward – News Category, a W3 awards Silver Winner and an EPpy Awards winner for Best Innovation Project. In April 2018, it was announced that The Perspective is nominated for both the Webby Award (News and Politics Category) and The Drum Award (Best Editorial Innovation).

Site features
The site's features are designed to persuade readers to consider ideas threatening to their worldview:
The Big Debates – Original articles, presenting two sides of a classic debate, but researched and written in a way that appeals to the values of those who might be opposed to it.
Subjective Timeline – Features the biggest ongoing conflicts on a timeline that shows how the same milestones are perceived by both sides who took part in it.
Trending Perspectives – The editorial team scours the web to find worthwhile contradictory or enriching articles and videos on daily hot topics which are displayed side by side (with short summary). Users can read, vote, comment, and play.
The Perspective Challenge – A gamified platform where users get to influence someone they know and "pay" by allowing their own point of view be influenced.
My Perspective – UGC platform that allows people to share how issues relate to them in their daily lives.

Brand extensions 
In September 2021, the Perspective launched its first book, titled What The Hell Are They Thinking?  This book is a collection of 100 hotly debated topics that govern readers' lives and cover politics and government, economics, popular culture, sports, health, religion and more. The book features the website's most popular, most engaged-with "Big Debates", especially updated for this book, with 30 new debates added exclusively for the book's release. These debates were written in a way that tells both sides of every story.

References

Israeli news websites
Internet properties established in 2017
English-language websites